Ghazipur is a village in East Delhi district of Delhi, India. situated near Delhi-Uttar Pradesh border near Ghaziabad. It is the Brahman and Gurjar dominated village. The majority Brahman gotra is Jamdagni and Gurjar gotra is dedha. It is one of the biggest village in Delhi. By the time many castes are living in this village with harmony. It is located 8 km towards north from district headquarters Preet Vihar.

The toll plaza of Delhi–Meerut Expressway is known as Ghazipur Border Which connects Delhi to Noida. Ghazipur is a new commercial hub and many new markets for flowers, fruits, clothes have come up. Ghazipur landfill has been one of the largest dumping sites for Delhi. Landfill has grown over the past years that it is now visible from 5 km.

 The famous Personalities of this village are :-

Pt. Manoj Sharma ( Social Worker )

Smt. Geeta Sharma ( Ex-Councillor )

Sh. Naseeb Singh ( Ex- MLA )

Nearby Places
Hasanpur Village (800 m), Kalyanpuri (2 km), Anand Vihar (2 km), Nirman Vihar (3 km), Surajmal Vihar (4 km), Patparganj (4 km) are the nearby Villages to Ghazipur. Ghazipur is surrounded by Delhi Tehsil towards west, East Delhi Tehsil towards South, Central Delhi Tehsil towards west, North Delhi Tehsil towards North. 
NOIDA, Delhi, Ghaziabad, Loni are the nearby Cities to Ghazipur.
This Place is in the border of the East Delhi District and Gautam Buddha Nagar District. Gautam Buddha Nagar District Bisrakh is East towards this place. It is near to the Uttar Pradesh State Border.
Demographics of Ghazipur Hindi is the Local Language here.

Transportation
By road it is connected to Delhi Meerut Expressway. Anand Vihar ISBT is the nearest bus terminus which is 2 km away from Ghazipur. Anand Vihar Railway Station is the nearby railway station to Ghazipur. However Hazrat Nizamuddin Railway Station is the major railway station 9 km near Ghazipur. IP extension is the nearest metro station.

Villages in East Delhi district